Island Packet Yachts is an American builder of blue water cruising sailing and motor yachts, based out of Largo, Florida.

Island Packet Yachts is a subsidiary of Traditional Watercraft, Inc., founded by naval architect Bob Johnson in 1979. In January 2017, Darrell and Leslie Allen took ownership of the company, and it became Island Packet and Seaward Yachts. The Allens have a long history with Island Packet as the dealer in San Diego, CA, for over 25 years. The Allens started with just 13 employees and today are at over 50, with many returning craftsmen who have over 20 years of experience building Island Packet Yachts. Island Packet Yachts 349 was named Cruising World's 2019 Domestic Boat of the Year and the 439 model winning Cruising World's 2021 Best Full Size Cruiser of the Year.

History
Island Packet models have won several industry awards over the years, including seven Cruising World magazine "Boat of the Year" awards and three SAIL magazine "Best Boats" awards. Most recently, Island Packet Yachts has won Cruising World Magazine's "Domestic Boat of the Year" Award in 2019 for the 349, and in 2021, they won Cruising World Magazine's "Best Full-Size Cruiser of the Year" Award. Original owner and Naval Architect Bob Johnson is also the recipient of the 1999 "Industry Award for Leadership" presented by SAIL magazine.

In mid April 2016 Traditional Watercraft was acquired by Hake Yachts, who combined operations to build Island Packet, Blue Jacket and Seaward yachts in the Largo, Florida facilities.

Models
 Sailboats (chronological order of introduction)
 Island Packet (26 Mark I) -1980
 Island Packet 26 (Mark II) -1982
 Island Packet 31 -1983 - 1989
 Island Packet 27 -1984 - 1992
 Island Packet 38 -1986 - 1995
 Island Packet 35 - 1988 - 1994
 Island Packet 32 -1989 - 1995
 Island Packet 29 -1981 - 1997
 Island Packet 44 -1991 - 1995
 Packet Cat (35) -1992
 Island Packet 40 -1993 - 1995
 Island Packet 37 -1994 - 1995
 Island Packet 45 -1995 - 1995
 Island Packet 350 -1996–present
 Island Packet 320 -1997–present
 Island Packet 380 -1998–present
 Island Packet 420 -1999–present
 Island Packet 485 -2002–present
 Island Packet 370 -2003–present
 Island Packet 445 -2004–present
 Island Packet 440 -2005–present
 SP Cruiser -2006–present
 Island Packet 465 -2007–present
 Island Packet 460 -2008–present
 Island Packet Estero -2009–present
 Island Packet 360 -2011–present
 Island Packet 349 - 2019–Present
 Island Packet 439 - 2021–Present
 Powerboats
 Packet Craft (36) -2001–present
 PY Cruiser -2006–present

See also
 List of sailboat designers and manufacturers

References

Bibliography
 Sail Magazine July 2006 Pgs 64 - 67 
 Heart of GLASS, Fiberglass Boats And The Men Who Made Them by Daniel Spurr pages 244 - 250
 PHRF of Southern California
 "Full Keels and High Tech", Sailing Magazine, September 1992, John Kretschmer
 The Island Packet 31", Practical Sailor, September 1991, pages 28–32
 "Bob Johnson: a love affair with boat design", Florida Business/Tampa Bay, June 1987

External links
 

Island Packet Yachts